DJ Bass Boy is a Miami bass DJ first released in 1992 on Newtown Records. Bass Boy released three studio albums. The album I Got The Bass peaked at 86 on the Billboard charts.

Discography

Studio albums

References

American electronic music groups
American electro musicians
Living people
Year of birth missing (living people)